Narcissus cavanillesii is a species of Narcissus (daffodils) in the family Amaryllidaceae native to the Iberian Peninsula and Northwest Africa. It is classified in Section Tapeinanthus, of which it is the sole member. Formerly, it was classified as a separate genus, Tapeinanthus.

Description
Unlike the remaining species of Narcissus, the corona is almost completely absent, which was why it was formerly classified as a separate genus.

Distribution and habitat
Narcissus cavanillesii is native to the southwest Iberian Peninsula and Northwest Africa (in Morocco, south to Agadir, and Algeria) and inhabits forest clearings, scrublands, Mediterranean pastures, riparian communities and road edges in sub-humid Mediterranean climates from sea level up to  a.s.l., occasionally .

References 

cavanillesii
Garden plants
Flora of Southwestern Europe
Flora of North Africa